The Last Mile may refer to:

 The Last Mile (prison rehabilitation program), a program for inmates in the California corrections system
 The Last Mile (play), a 1930 play by John Wexley
 The Last Mile (1932 film), an American adaptation of the play, directed by Samuel Bischoff
 The Last Mile, a 1952 industrial short film directed by Robert Altman
 The Last Mile (1959 film), an American adaptation of the play, directed by Howard W. Koch
 The Last Mile (1992 film), an American short TV play
 The Last Mile (song), a 1988 song by Cinderella
 "The Last Mile", a 1965 song by Nico

See also 
 Last mile (disambiguation)